Thomas Verhaar (born 8 March 1988) is a Dutch professional footballer who plays as a winger for AFC.

Career
Verhaar played in the youth academy of Sparta Rotterdam and Willem II, before ending up at amateur club VOC. He played for the club for four years and made his senior debut there. During this period, he was also on a three-month loan with American club Houston Dutch Lions. In the summer of 2014, he was signed by Sparta Rotterdam, at that time playing in the second-tier Eerste Divisie. He made his debut on 10 August 2014 in a 2–1 home win over Den Bosch. Verhaar was in the starting lineup, but was replaced by Giovanni Hiwat during the match. During his second game he scored his first goal; away against Achilles '29 he made another start and secured the 1–3 final score in injury time. In the 2015–16 season, Verhaar won the Eerste Divisie title with Sparta, and as a result the club from the Spangen area returned to the Eredivisie after a six-year asence. At the end of the 2017–18 season, Sparta relegated to the Eerste Divisie again. There, Verhaar played another eight games before moving to South African club Ajax Cape Town in January 2019. He played there for six months. In June 2019, he returned to Rotterdam, this time to Excelsior where he signed a two-year contract.

On 7 April 2021, he agreed to join AFC for the 2021–22 season.

Honours

Club
Sparta Rotterdam
 Eerste Divisie: 2015–16

References

External links
 
 

1988 births
Living people
Association football wingers
Dutch footballers
Sparta Rotterdam players
Dayton Dutch Lions players
Cape Town Spurs F.C. players
Excelsior Rotterdam players
Amsterdamsche FC players
Eredivisie players
Eerste Divisie players
Tweede Divisie players
National First Division players
Footballers from Rotterdam
Dutch expatriate footballers
Expatriate soccer players in South Africa
Dutch expatriate sportspeople in South Africa